Charles Laverick (1881 – after 1906) was an English footballer who made 74 appearances in the Football League playing for Doncaster Rovers and Lincoln City. He played at full back. Before joining Doncaster, he was on the books of Newcastle United, but never represented them in the league.

Notes

References

1881 births
Year of death missing
Place of birth missing
English footballers
Association football fullbacks
Newcastle United F.C. players
Doncaster Rovers F.C. players
Lincoln City F.C. players
English Football League players
Midland Football League players
Place of death missing